Welcome to Sunny Florida is the name of a DVD and CD set released by singer-songwriter Tori Amos in 2004. The set features a live concert performance by Amos from her 2002 " On Scarlet's Walk" tour, in support of her album Scarlet's Walk. It was recorded live at Sound Advice Amphitheatre in West Palm Beach, Florida. The DVD also features photographs and other exclusive material including a full-length interview with Amos. The title is a sarcastic reference to the fact that on September 4, 2003 (the day of filming) there was a rainstorm.

Accompanying the DVD is an EP called Scarlet's Hidden Treasures, which features six non-LP tracks. The DVD/CD was released in either a double CD jewel case, or in a special DVD case.

Some controversy was sparked when the words "fucker" and "cock" were censored out of the live performance of the song "Professional Widow". Amos, who is an avid anti-censorship proponent, explained in an interview that she felt it was important not to have a parental advisory sticker on the label so that young people would be able to have access to the DVD, as she touches on many important political issues in her works.

Although not mentioned in the track listing, Amos sings the first four lines of "Muhammad My Friend" as a bridge for "Take to the Sky".

The set reached UK No. 1 on the Music Videos and DVDs Chart, and No. 2 on the US equivalent, qualifying it as a commercial success.

DVD

Main Set List
 "A Sorta Fairytale"
 "Sugar"
 "Crucify"
 "Interlude #1"
 "Cornflake Girl"
 "Bells for Her"
 "Concertina"
 "Interlude #2"
 "Take to the Sky"
 "Leather"
 "Cloud on My Tongue"
 "Cooling"
 "Interlude #3"
 "Your Cloud"
 "Father Lucifer"
 "Professional Widow"
 "I Can't See New York"
 "Precious Things"

Encore
 "Tombigbee" (2nd take)
 "Amber Waves"
 "Hey Jupiter"

Cut Songs
"Wednesday"
"Tombigbee" (1st take)
"Virginia"
"Sweet Sangria"
"Past the Mission" (Audio featured on DVD photo gallery)

Scarlet's Hidden Treasures
 "Ruby Through the Looking Glass"
 "Seaside"
 "Bug a Martini"
 "Apollo's Frock"
 "Tombigbee"
 "Indian Summer"

External links

Tori Amos video albums
2004 video albums
Live video albums
2004 live albums